Catharanthus roseus, commonly known as bright eyes, Cape periwinkle, graveyard plant, Madagascar periwinkle, old maid, pink periwinkle, rose periwinkle, is a perennial species of flowering plant in the family Apocynaceae. It is native and endemic to Madagascar, but grown elsewhere as an ornamental and medicinal plant. It is a source of the drugs vincristine and vinblastine, used to treat cancer. It was formerly included in the genus Vinca as Vinca rosea.

It has many vernacular names among which are arivotaombelona or rivotambelona, tonga, tongatse or trongatse, tsimatiririnina, and vonenina.

Synonyms 
Two varieties are recognized
 Catharanthus roseus var. roseus
 Synonymy for this variety
Catharanthus roseus var. angustus Steenis ex Bakhuizen f.
 Catharanthus roseus var. albus G.Don
 Catharanthus roseus var. occellatus G.Don
 Catharanthus roseus var. nanus Markgr.
 Lochnera rosea f. alba (G.Don) Woodson
 Lochnera rosea var. ocellata (G.Don) Woodson
 Catharanthus roseus var. angustus (Steenis) Bakh. f.
 Synonymy for this variety
 Catharanthus roseus var. nanus Markgr.
 Lochnera rosea var. angusta Steenis

Description 

Ecology 
In the wild, C. roseus is an endangered plant; the main cause of decline is habitat destruction by slash and burn agriculture. It is also, however, widely cultivated and is naturalized in subtropical and tropical areas of the world such as Australia, Bangladesh, India, Malaysia, Pakistan, and the United States.  It is so well adapted to growth in Australia that it is listed as a noxious weed in Western Australia and the Australian Capital Territory, and also in parts of eastern Queensland.

Cultivation 
As an ornamental plant, it is appreciated for its hardiness in dry and nutritionally deficient conditions, popular in subtropical gardens where temperatures never fall below , and as a warm-season bedding plant in temperate gardens. It is noted for its long flowering period, throughout the year in tropical conditions, and from spring to late autumn, in warm temperate climates. Full sun and well-drained soil are preferred. Numerous cultivars have been selected, for variation in flower colour (white, mauve, peach, scarlet, and reddish-orange), and also for tolerance of cooler growing conditions in temperate regions.

Notable cultivars include 'Albus' (white flowers), 'Grape Cooler' (rose-pink; cool-tolerant), the Ocellatus Group (various colours), and 'Peppermint Cooler' (white with a red centre; cool-tolerant).

In the U.S. it often remains identified as "Vinca" although botanists have shifted its identification and it often can be seen growing along roadsides in the south.

In the United Kingdom it has gained the Royal Horticultural Society’s Award of Garden Merit (confirmed 2017).

Uses

Traditional 
The species has long been cultivated for herbal medicine, as it can be traced back to 2600 BC Mesopotamia. In Ayurveda (Indian traditional medicine) the extracts of its roots and shoots, although poisonous, are used against several diseases. In traditional Chinese medicine, extracts from it have been used against numerous diseases, including diabetes, malaria, and Hodgkin's lymphoma. In the 1950s, vinca alkaloids, including vinblastine and vincristine, were isolated from Catharanthus roseus while screening for anti-diabetic drugs. This chance discovery led to increased research into the chemotherapeutic effects of vinblastine and vincristine. Conflict between historical indigenous use, and patent from 2001 on C. roseus-derived drugs by western pharmaceutical companies, without compensation, has led to accusations of biopiracy.

Medicinal 
Vinblastine and vincristine, chemotherapy medications used to treat several types of cancers, are found in the plant and are biosynthesised from the coupling of the alkaloids catharanthine and vindoline.  The newer semi-synthetic chemotherapeutic agent vinorelbine, used in the treatment of non-small-cell lung cancer, can be prepared either from vindoline and catharanthine or from the vinca alkaloid leurosine, in both cases via anhydrovinblastine. The insulin-stimulating vincoline has been isolated from the plant.

Research 
Despite the medical importance and wide use, the desired alkaloids (vinblastine and vincristine) are naturally produced at very low yields. Additionally, it is complex and costly to synthesize the desired products in a lab, resulting in difficulty satisfying the demand and a need for overproduction. Treatment of the plant with phytohormones, such as salicylic acid and methyl jasmonate, have been shown to trigger defense mechanisms and overproduce downstream alkaloids. Studies using this technique vary in growth conditions, choice of phytohormone, and location of treatment. Concurrently, there are various efforts to map the biosynthetic pathway producing the alkaloids to find a direct path to overproduction via genetic engineering.

C. roseus is used in plant pathology as an experimental host for phytoplasmas. This is because it is easy to infect with a large majority of phytoplasmas, and also often has very distinctive symptoms such as phyllody and significantly reduced leaf size.

Biology 
Rosinidin is the pink anthocyanidin pigment found in the flowers of C. roseus. Lochnericine is a major alkaloid in roots.

Toxicity 
C. roseus can be extremely toxic if consumed orally by humans, and is cited (under its synonym Vinca rosea) in the Louisiana State Act 159. All parts of the plant are poisonous. On consumption, symptoms consist of mild stomach cramps, cardiac complications, hypotension, systematic paralysis eventually leading to death.

According to French botanist Pierre Boiteau, its poisonous properties are made known along generations of Malagasy people as a poison consumed in ordeal trials, even before the tangena fruit was used. This lent the flower one of its names vonenina, from  meaning "flower of remorse".

Gallery

References

External links 
 
 

roseus
Endemic flora of Madagascar
Plants used in Ayurveda
Plants used in traditional Chinese medicine
Plants described in 1759